{{DISPLAYTITLE:Pi6 Orionis}}

Pi6 Orionis (π6 Ori, π6 Orionis) is a solitary star in the eastern part of the constellation Orion. It is visible to the naked eye with an apparent visual magnitude of 4.469. Based upon an annual parallax shift of 3.45 mas, it is around 950 light-years from the Sun. At that distance, the visual magnitude of the star is reduced by an interstellar absorption factor of 0.52.

This is an evolved K-type giant star on the horizontal branch, with a stellar classification of K0/1 III. It is a suspected variable star with a measured variation between 4.45 and 4.49 in visual magnitude. Pi6 Orionis has over four times the mass of the Sun and has expanded to around 88 times the Sun's radius. Over the course of its life span, the star has shed around  solar mass.

References

Suspected variables
K-type giants
Orion (constellation)
Orionis, Pi6
Durchmusterung objects
Orionis, 10
031767
023123
1601